Sosyan or Susiyan is a village in northern Aleppo Governorate, northwestern Syria. Nearby localities include Hezwan  to the southwest and Qubbet Elsheikh  to the northeast. In the 2004 census, Sosyan had a population of 1,452.

References

Populated places in al-Bab District